was a private university in Nishinomiya, Hyōgo, Japan which was consolidated with  in 2009.

The predecessor of the school was founded in 1880 as a Congregational Women's Seminary in Kōbe by two missionaries from the US, Julia Elizabeth Dudley and Martha J. Burrows. Chartered as a university in 1950, and became a four-year college in 1964. The school closed in 2013.

External links
 Official website 
 
 
 

Educational institutions established in 1880
Methodist universities and colleges
Universities and colleges in Hyōgo Prefecture
United Church of Christ in Japan
1880 establishments in Japan
Defunct private universities and colleges in Japan
Nishinomiya